Caferro is a surname. Notable people with the surname include:

Mary Caferro (born 1959), American politician
William Caferro, American historian

English-language surnames